TCNJ School of Business is one of seven schools at The College of New Jersey. The School of Business has been continually ranked as one of the best undergraduate business schools in the nation, and consistently #1 in New Jersey, according to Bloomberg Businessweek. It is also a fully accredited member of AACSB.

History

The School of Business was founded on July 1, 1981. Initially known as the Division of Business and Economics, it was renamed the School of Business. During the 1980s and 1990s, business classes were held in different buildings across campus. However, all business classes now take place in the Business Building. It was completed in 2000 in a Georgian colonial architecture style similar to much of the campus. Computers have always been a part of the business administration curriculum; the first computer labs were open at the Business School's conception. Its computer lab is noteworthy for being the first microcomputer lab in the country.

Degree programs

The School of Business at TCNJ primarily focuses on undergraduate education, offering Bachelor of Science degrees in:

Accounting and Information Systems
Economics
Finance 
International Business
Marketing
Management
Management
Interdisciplinary Business

Accounting
Most TCNJ accounting graduates join public accounting firms upon graduation. The Business School prepares accounting students for a variety of careers in accounting including Internal Auditing, Corporate Accounting, Governmental and Non-For-Profit Accounting, and Forensic Accounting. Accounting majors are, above all, taught to think critically and to communicate effectively in oral and written presentations. There are student chapters of the Institute of Management Accountants and the National Association of Black Accountants that sponsor career-planning and other co-curricular activities, as well as a chapter of Beta Alpha Psi.

According to Bloomberg Businessweek the undergraduate accounting program is ranked #46 in the country. The School boasts that 90-95% of accounting interns receive job offers from their employers. TCNJ accounting graduates have consistently achieved high passing rates when taking the CPA exam for the first time.

Economics
Obtaining the Bachelor of Science degree in economics at TCNJ indicates completion of the core business curriculum in addition to its economics requirements. The economics program provides extensive instruction in other business disciplines (e.g., finance, management) and its goal is to prepare students for MBA degree.

Finance
The finance program at TCNJ has the largest number of business students. The mission of the program is for students to have the ability to analyze the allocation of financial resources within a corporation or government setting; to analyze sources of funding and ramifications of financial decisions. Students graduating from TCNJ finance programs are employed by banks, financial institutions, brokerage houses, major corporations and the government. Many graduates of the program continue toward graduate education in top business schools.

International Business
The international business program offers courses emphasizing international trade and investments. It seeks to provide students with a strong background in international business, while fostering an appreciation for diverse cultures in varied business environments. To fulfill a graduation requirement, students must complete a one-semester study abroad.

Marketing, Management, MIS & Interdisciplinary Business
TCNJ students in marketing, management, management information systems, and interdisciplinary business are offered Bachelor of Science upon completion of required courses. A great deal of emphasis is placed on liberal arts education along with the core business requirements.

AACSB
The school received its initial accreditation from AACSB International in 1997 and was fully reaccredited in December 2008. It is now one of only 50 accredited institutions worldwide that focuses exclusively on undergraduate business education.

Notable alumni
Bryan M. Kuderna is a CFP, Life Underwriter Training Council Fellow and investment adviser representative with Kuderna Financial Team, a New Jersey-based financial services firm. He is also the author of the best-selling book Millennial Millionaire: A Guide to Become a Millionaire by 30. 
Sean O’Grady is the director of video production and a communications strategist with Oxford Communications. Prior, Sean was an entrepreneur and international broadcast journalist. He was the executive producer of the 2012 Paralympic Games in London, the host of Deloitte Insights, and the host and executive producer of CareerTV. Sean is a 2004 graduate and is an adjunct professor of public speaking and leadership development at the college.

References

External links

Business schools in New Jersey
The College of New Jersey
Educational institutions established in 1981